Gromit Unleashed was a public charity art trail led by Wallace & Gromit's Grand Appeal and Aardman Animations, in which 80 giant artist-decorated fibreglass sculptures of Gromit were displayed on the streets of Bristol and the surrounding area between 1 July and 8 September 2013. At the end of the art trail, the sculptures were auctioned to raise funds for Wallace & Gromit's Grand Appeal, the Bristol Children's Hospital Charity. The Grand Appeal pledged to raise £3.5 million for state-of-the-art equipment for Bristol Children's Hospital, including an intraoperative MRI scanner, family facilities and child-friendly artwork to help save the lives of sick children at the hospital. All funds raised by Gromit Unleashed contributed towards this.
The project follows the concept of the "Land in Sicht", the original Swiss project by artistic director Walter Knapp which inspired the subsequent worldwide exhibition "CowParade" and similar exhibitions in other cities, including Wow! Gorillas which took place in Bristol in 2011. To date Gromit Unleashed has raised over £5 million for Bristol Children's Hospital.

Background

Gromit 

Gromit is a dog belonging to an eccentric inventor, Wallace, in a series of claymation films produced by Aardman Animations, based in Spike Island, Bristol. Three of the films in the Wallace and Gromit film series have won Academy Awards: The Wrong Trousers, A Close Shave and Wallace & Gromit: The Curse of the Were-Rabbit.

Wallace and Gromit's Grand Appeal 
The aim of Gromit Unleashed was to fundraise for Wallace and Gromit's Grand Appeal. Founded in 1995, the charity raises funds for paediatric medical equipment at the Bristol Royal Hospital for Children and St. Michael's Hospital. In collaboration with Aardman, it uses the characters Wallace and Gromit as mascots for the charity.

Funds were raised through the sale of trail maps, merchandise, and Detect-o-Gromit, a smartphone app, aimed at helping users find the Gromit sculptures, costing 69p per download. On the first week, Detect-o-Gromit reached #1 on the Entertainment chart and #2 on the Paid chart on Apple's App Store.

Sculptures

Creation
 
Each recipient was free to design their statue as they wished, producing a vast array of designs. Some of the statues were publicly painted by their designers in the Galleries shopping centre.
Each statue was then transported to an undisclosed warehouse in Bristol to be treated with a lacquer and erected onto a concrete plinth. Nick Park's own sculpture, Newshound, is the only sculpture which feature Wallace, alongside his trusty canine sidekick Gromit.

On 1 July 2013, the statues were distributed around Bristol and tourist attractions in the Greater Bristol area. One was also placed at London Paddington station, but was moved to the Gromit Unleashed HQ for the final week of the exhibition.  Sculptures were decorated by a range of artists and celebrities, including Joanna Lumley, Sir Peter Blake, Trevor Baylis and Jools Holland. The Royal Mint and mosaic artist Stephanie Roberts created a special Royal Mint Gromit, decorated with coins. US Animation studio Pixar contributed Gromit Lightyear, based on their character Buzz Lightyear. The sculptures were auctioned in October to raise funds for Bristol Children's Hospital.

In addition a number of smaller Gromit sculptures were distributed to schools and community groups to decorate. Bristol tourism staff have estimated that Gromit Unleashed could bring as much as £58 million to the city during the two-month display, with many visitors expected from the United States and Japan, where Wallace and Gromit are popular. The local media reported on the use of a new word "Gromiting", being used on social media sites to describe the search for the sculptures.

Vandalism

Due to the openness of the outdoor sculptures in the trail, they were vulnerable to vandalism. In total, five sculptures were vandalised during the exhibition:
 Poetry in Motion by Joanna Lumley was removed before the first day of the trail on 28 June, after vandals ripped off its tail. It was restored and replaced back on 17 July.
 Carosello by Giuliano Carapia was ripped from its plinth two days into the trail (3 July). It was restored and replaced back on 11 July, to applause from bystanders.
 Groscar by Chris Taylor had its ear ripped off on the night of 17 August. It was restored and replaced back on 28 August.
 Bark at Ee by Leigh Flurry and Patch by Emily Golden were also damaged during the trail.

Auction

After the trail had finished, all of the Gromit statues were collected and displayed together at a marquee at The Mall, Cribbs Causeway, which attracted more than 25,000 visitors.

On 3 October 2013 the 81 statues, alongside 11 smaller statues, were auctioned off at a special event hosted by Sotheby's auctioneer and TV presenter Tim Wonnacott at the marquee. Wonnacott was paid to host the auction, to some criticism, as it was a charitable event. The pressure group Fathers 4 Justice were reportedly banned from bidding on one statue, Hero, over claims that it would use the statue for publicising their campaign if they won it.

The pre-auction estimate for the grand total was £1 million; this was exceeded after the 39th statue was sold. Every statue also exceeded the reserve price of £10,000.  The Gromit which attracted the highest bid was Gromit Lightyear, designed by Disney Pixar and based on the Toy Story character Buzz Lightyear which sold for £65,000.  The grand total raised from the sale of the sculptures was £2,357,000.

Impact and legacy 
The sale of the Gromit statues, app downloads and merchandise initially raised £2.3million for Wallace and Gromit’s Grand Appeal. The money was spent on lifesaving medical equipment and products to enhance patient comfort at the Bristol Royal Hospital for Children, during its planned expansion. An intraoperative MRI scanner was bought for the hospital using the funds, which the hospital previously did not have.

Gromit Unleashed’s financial success led organisers to plan a sequel almost immediately after the trail finished. David Sproxton, the chair of Aardman Animations, suggested that a trail involving Shaun the Sheep, another Wallace and Gromit character, could be “rolled out nationally... or even internationally”. This idea developed into the Shaun in the City sculpture trail, which was held in Bristol in the summer of 2015. A sequel for Gromit Unleashed was unleashed in 2018 which features sculpture statues of Gromit, Wallace on a life-size bench, and Feathers McGraw.

List of Gromit sculptures
All information is taken from the Gromit Unleashed website.

See also
 Gromit Unleashed 2
 Shaun in the City

Notes

References

External links

Official site
Bristol Tourism's Gromit Unleashed site

2013 sculptures
Sculptures in England
Arts in Bristol
Wallace and Gromit
Painted statue public art
Statues of fictional characters